Donacaula albicostella is a moth in the family Crambidae. It was described by Charles H. Fernald in 1888. It is found in North America, where it has been recorded from Alberta, British Columbia, Manitoba, California, Connecticut, Illinois, Maine, Massachusetts, Michigan, Minnesota, New Jersey, Utah and Wisconsin.

References

Moths described in 1888
Schoenobiinae